Horacio Nava Meza (born January 20, 1982 in Chihuahua) is a  male race walker from Mexico. He represented Mexico at the 2008 Summer Olympics and 2012 Summer Olympics is a five-time participant at the World Championships in Athletics (2005 to 2013). He was the runner-up over 50 km at the 2007 Pan American Games and the 2010 IAAF World Race Walking Cup. He won gold medals over that distance at the 2010 CAC Games and the 2011 Pan American Games.

He was third over 20 km at the 2012 IAAF World Race Walking Challenge meet held in his native Chihuahua.

He has qualified to represent Mexico at the 2020 Summer Olympics.

Personal bests

Achievements

References

External links

1982 births
Living people
People from Chihuahua City
Sportspeople from Chihuahua (state)
Mexican male racewalkers
Olympic athletes of Mexico
Athletes (track and field) at the 2008 Summer Olympics
Athletes (track and field) at the 2012 Summer Olympics
Athletes (track and field) at the 2016 Summer Olympics
Pan American Games medalists in athletics (track and field)
Pan American Games gold medalists for Mexico
Pan American Games silver medalists for Mexico
Pan American Games bronze medalists for Mexico
Athletes (track and field) at the 2007 Pan American Games
Athletes (track and field) at the 2011 Pan American Games
Athletes (track and field) at the 2015 Pan American Games
Athletes (track and field) at the 2019 Pan American Games
World Athletics Championships athletes for Mexico
Central American and Caribbean Games gold medalists for Mexico
Competitors at the 2010 Central American and Caribbean Games
Central American and Caribbean Games medalists in athletics
Medalists at the 2007 Pan American Games
Medalists at the 2011 Pan American Games
Medalists at the 2015 Pan American Games
Medalists at the 2019 Pan American Games
Athletes (track and field) at the 2020 Summer Olympics
21st-century Mexican people